"Te Dejo en Libertad" is a song written and recorded by American duo Ha*Ash. It was first included on their fourth studio album A Tiempo (2011) and was released as the second single. A live version was included on their album Primera Fila: Hecho Realidad (2014). The song then included on their live album Ha*Ash: En Vivo (2019). It was written by Ashley Grace, Hanna Nicole and José Luis Ortega.

Background and release 
"Te Dejo en Libertad" was recorded and included on the fourth studio album by Ha*Ash titled A Tiempo. It was later released as the second single from this album. Three years later it was included on the set list for Ha*Ash's live album Primera Fila: Hecho Realidad.

"Te Dejo en Libertad" featuring Maldita Nerea was released as a promotional single on January 8, 2016 in Spain. Ha*Ash and Maldita Nerea performed the song live together for the first time at the concert in Barclay Card Center, Spain on December 20, 2016.

Commercial performance 
The track peaked at number 29 in the Latin Pop Songs charts in the United States. In Mexico, the song peaked at number one on the Mexican Singles Chart and Monitor Latino. In 2013, it was announced that "Te Dejo en Libertad" had been certified Gold+Platinum.

Music video 
A music video for "Te Dejo en Libertad" was released on July 20, 2011. The video was filmed in Mexico City. , the video has over 454 million views on YouTube.

The second music video for "Te Dejo en Libertad", recorded live for the live album Primera Fila: Hecho Realidad, was released on April 24, 2015. It was directed by Nahuel Lerena. The video was filmed in Estudios Churubusco, Mexico City. , the video has over 30 million views on YouTube.

The third video for "Te Dejo en Libertad", recorded live for the live album Ha*Ash: En Vivo, was released on December 6, 2019. The video was filmed in Auditorio Nacional, Mexico City.

Cover versions 
In February 2019, Mexican band  Pandora covered Ha*Ash's song for their album Mas Pandora Que Nunca.

Credits and personnel 
Credits adapted from AllMusic and Genius.

Recording and management

 Recording Country: United States
 Sony / ATV Discos Music Publishing LLC / Westwood Publishing
 (P) 2011 Sony Music Entertainment México, S.A. De C.V. (studio version)
 (P) 2014 Sony Music Entertainment US Latin LLC (live version)

Ha*Ash
 Ashley Grace – vocals, guitar, songwriting (studio version / live version)
 Hanna Nicole – vocals, guitar, piano, songwriting (studio version / live version)
Additional personnel
 Áureo Baqueiro – chorus, production, piano (studio version)
 José Luis Ortega – songwriting (studio version / live version)
 Vicky Echeverri – chorus, piano (studio version)
 Charlie García – A&R (studio version)
 Paul Forat – A&R (live version)
 Gonzalo Herrerias – A&R (live version)
 George Noriega – producer (live version)
 Tim Mitchell – producer (live version)

Charts

Certifications

Awards and nominations

Release history

References 

Ha*Ash songs
Songs written by Ashley Grace
Songs written by Hanna Nicole
Songs written by José Luis Ortega
Song recordings produced by Áureo Baqueiro
2011 songs
2011 singles
Spanish-language songs
Pop ballads
Sony Music Latin singles
2010s ballads
Monitor Latino Top General number-one singles